Bass Site may refer to:

Bass Site (Yellow Jacket, Colorado)
Raymond Bass Site (22HR636), Biloxi, Mississippi, listed on the NRHP in Harrison County, Mississippi
Bass Pond Site, Kiawah Island, South Carolina
Bass Site (47Gt25), Lancaster, Wisconsin, listed on the NRHP in Grant County, Wisconsin

See also
Bass House (disambiguation)